Aerodrom Municipality may refer to:
 Aerodrom Municipality, Skopje, a municipality of the city of Skopje, North Macedonia
 Aerodrom, Kragujevac, a former city municipality of the city of Kragujevac, Serbia

Municipality name disambiguation pages